Parviz Nasibov (born 18 August 1998) is a Ukrainian Greco-Roman wrestler from Azerbaijan. He represented Ukraine at the 2020 Summer Olympics in Tokyo 2021, competing in Men's Greco-Roman 67 kg. He resides in Zaporizhzhia, Ukraine.

References

External links 
 
 

 

1998 births
Living people
Ukrainian people of Azerbaijani descent
Ukrainian male sport wrestlers
Olympic wrestlers of Ukraine
Wrestlers at the 2020 Summer Olympics
People from Aghstafa District
Medalists at the 2020 Summer Olympics
Olympic medalists in wrestling
Olympic silver medalists for Ukraine